The 1943 World Series was the championship series in Major League Baseball for the 1943 season. The 40th edition of the World Series, it matched the defending champion St. Louis Cardinals against the New York Yankees, in a rematch of the 1942 Series.  The Yankees won the Series in five games for their tenth championship in 21 seasons.  It was Yankees manager Joe McCarthy's final Series win. This series was also the first to have an accompanying World Series highlight film (initially, the films were created as gifts to troops fighting in World War II, to give them a brief recap of baseball action back home), a tradition that persists.

This World Series was scheduled for a 3–4 format because of wartime travel restrictions.  The 3–4 format meant there was only one trip between ballparks, but if the Series had ended in a four-game sweep, there would have been three games played in one park and only one in the other.

Because of World War II, both teams' rosters were depleted. Johnny Beazley, Jimmy Brown, Creepy Crespi, Terry Moore and Enos Slaughter were no longer on the Cardinals' roster. Joe DiMaggio, Phil Rizzuto, Red Ruffing and Buddy Hassett were missing from the Yankees, and Red Rolfe had retired to coach at Dartmouth College.

Cardinals pitchers Howie Pollet, Max Lanier and Mort Cooper ranked 1–2–3 in the National League in ERA in 1943 at 1.75, 1.90 and 2.30, respectively.

Summary

Matchups

Game 1

In Game 1, the Cardinals went up 1–0 in the second against Spud Chandler on Marty Marion's RBI double with two on. In the fourth inning, with runners on first and third and no outs off Max Lanier, Charlie Keller's double-play tied the game, then Joe Gordon's home run put the Yankees up 2–1. The Cardinals tied the game in the fifth inning when Ray Sanders hit a leadoff single, moved to second on an error and scored on Lanier's single. In the sixth inning, after two leadoff singles, a one-out wild pitch by Lanier put the Yankees up 3–2, then Bill Dickey added an insurance run with an RBI single. Chandler pitched a complete game to give the Yankees a 1–0 series lead.

Game 2

The Cardinals' only victory came the same day as the death of Mort and Walker Cooper's father, Robert. Marty Marion's leadoff home run in the third off Tiny Bonham put the Cardinals up 1–0. In the fourth, Stan Musial hit a leadoff single, moved to second on a groundout and scored on Whitey Kurowski's RBI single. Ray Sanders's two-run home run then made it 4–0 Cardinals. In the bottom of the inning, Charlie Keller's sacrifice fly with two on off Mort Cooper put the Yankees on the board. In the ninth, Billy Johnson hit a leadoff double, then scored on Cooper's triple. After a line-out, Nick Etten's RBI groundout cut the Cardinals' lead to one, but Cooper got Joe Gordon to pop out in foul territory to end the game and tie the series 1–1.

Game 3

The Cardinals loaded the bases in the fourth on a single, double and intentional walk off Hank Borowy before Danny Litwhiler drove in two with a single to left, but Borowy allowed no other runs in eight innings. In the sixth, Borowy hit a leadoff double off Al Brazle, moved to third on a sacrifice fly, and scored on an error on Billy Johnson's groundball. In the eighth, the Yankees loaded the bases on a single, fielder's choice and intentional walk before Johnson cleared them with a triple, putting the Yankees up 4–2. They added to their lead on RBI singles by Joe Gordon off Howie Krist and Nick Etten off Harry Brecheen. Johnny Murphy pitched a perfect ninth as the Yankees went up 2–1 in the series.

Game 4

In Game 4, the Yankees struck first when Joe Gordon doubled with two outs in the fourth off Max Lanier and scored on Bill Dickey's single. In the seventh, Marius Russo got two outs, then allowed the Cardinals to load the bases on an error, double and intentional walk before another error on Frank Demaree's groundball tied the game. In the eighth, Russo hit a leadoff double off Harry Brecheen, moved to third on a sacrifice bunt and scored on Frankie Crosetti's sacrifice fly. Russo pitched a complete game to leave the Yankees one win away from the championship.

Game 5

Murry Dickson, who helped close the door for the Cardinals by allowing no hits while on the mound, was on a ten-day pass from the United States Army. Spud Chandler won his second complete game of the series, shutting out the Cardinals despite giving up 10 hits and two walks. Bill Dickey provided the game's only runs on a home run in the sixth after a two-out walk off Mort Cooper.

Composite box
1943 World Series (4–1): New York Yankees (A.L.) over St. Louis Cardinals (N.L.)

Notes

See also
1943 Negro World Series

References

External links

World Series
World Series
New York Yankees postseason
St. Louis Cardinals postseason
World Series
World Series
1940s in St. Louis
World Series
Baseball competitions in New York City
Baseball competitions in St. Louis
1940s in the Bronx